{{DISPLAYTITLE:Vitamin B1 analogues}}

Vitamin B1 analogues are analogues of vitamin B1, thiamine. They typically have improved bioavailability relative to thiamine itself, and are used to treat conditions caused by vitamin B1 deficiency. These conditions include beriberi, Korsakoff's syndrome, Wernicke's encephalopathy and diabetic neuropathy.

List of vitamin B1 analogues
Vitamin B1 analogues include:

See also 
 B vitamins
 Thiamine pyrophosphate, a thiamine derivative

References 

Thiamine